The Horse Spring Formation is a geologic formation in Nevada. It preserves fossils dating back to the Neogene period. The lower unit is conglomerate and the middle and upper are sandstone and freshwater limestone.

See also

 List of fossiliferous stratigraphic units in Nevada
 Paleontology in Nevada

References

Neogene geology of Nevada